Eddy Etaeta (born June 1, 1970) is a football manager and former football player from Tahiti in French Polynesia. He is best known within Oceania for coaching Tahiti to their 2012 OFC Nations Cup title, and is known worldwide for coaching the team during their 2013 FIFA Confederations Cup campaign.

Playing career

International
Eddy Etaeta played international football for the Tahiti national team and participated in two OFC zone qualifiers for the FIFA World Cup. The first of these was for the 1994 World Cup, in which Etaeta made his international debut in the game against the Solomon Islands on October 9, 1992 in Papeete, Tahiti. The Tahitians won 4-2, and ended up in 2nd place in their group, missing out on qualification. Eddy retired from international football in 1998.

International Career statistics

¿: Eddy played a total of 5 games for Tahiti. The 5th game could have been any time between 1992 and 1998.

Coaching career 
In mid-2010 Etaeta was hired by the Tahitian Football Federation to manage the national team. His first tournament as manager was the 2011 Pacific Games. Tahiti ended up finishing a respectable 3rd, winning the bronze medal. However, Etaeta's real success came in 2012, when his Tahiti team won the 2012 OFC Nations Cup in Honiara in the Solomon Islands, the first time they had ever won the tournament. This success meant Tahiti went on to represent the OFC at the 2013 FIFA Confederations Cup, where they went out in the Group Stages.

In 2015 he moved to France, where he coached for the Occitanian regional league.

Personal life
Eddy is married and has two sons.

He also has at least one sibling, Eric Etaeta, who also played international football for Tahiti.

Honours

As a manager
Football at the Pacific Games
 Bronze medal (1): 2011
OFC Nations Cup:
 Winner (1): 2012

References

External links

1970 births
Living people
French Polynesian football managers
Tahiti national football team managers
1996 OFC Nations Cup players
2013 FIFA Confederations Cup managers
French Polynesian footballers
Association football midfielders